Emile Lamm (24 November 1834 – 12 July 1873, in New Orleans) was a French-born American inventor and dentist.

Lamm was born in Aÿ, France, but moved to Louisiana in 1848 at the age of 14. He patented various improvements in techniques of gold dental fillings, and developed a number of innovative designs for street railways.  These later were inspired by wishes to improve the Streetcars in New Orleans, as there was a desire for faster and more powerful propulsion than horsecars could provide, while steam locomotives created noise, smoke, and soot that was undesirable in city streets. The most successful of Lamm's designs was "Lamm's Fireless Engine", which ran on the St. Charles Avenue Streetcar line in New Orleans in the 1870s and 1880s, and also saw wide use in the street railways of Paris.

References

1834 births
1873 deaths
19th-century American inventors
People from New Orleans
American people in rail transportation
French emigrants to the United States